This is a list of all own goals scored during FIFA World Cup matches (not including qualification games). In 1997, FIFA published guidelines for classifying an own goal as "when a player plays the ball directly into his own net or when he redirects an opponent’s shot, cross or pass into his own goal", and excludes "shots that are on target (i.e. goal-bound) and touch a defender or rebound from the goal frame and bounce off a defender or goalkeeper".

Of the 2720 goals scored at the 22 final tournaments of the World Cup, only 54 have been own goals. No player has scored multiple own goals. Mexico's players have scored own goals on four occasions each, while France has benefited on six occasions from opponents scoring own goals. Of the 53 matches with an own goal, nine have ended as wins for the team scoring the own goal, and eight have ended as draws. All but 13 own goals have been scored in the first stages of the tournament.

Following the 1994 murder of Colombian Andrés Escobar by a fan who was angry that Escobar's own goal had led to their country's early exit from that year's World Cup, own goals at the tournament have been subject to intense scrutiny, to stave off accusations of collusion. The 2018 World Cup, dubbed by The Washington Post as "among the cruelest in history" based on own goals mid-way through the group stages, ended up doubling the previous record for number of own goals at a single tournament.

List

Notes

Statistics and notable own goals
Time
 First ever own goal
 Manuel Rosas, Mexico vs Chile, 1930
 Fastest own goal
 Sead Kolašinac, 3', Bosnia and Herzegovina vs Argentina, 2014
 Latest regulation-time own goal
 Aziz Bouhaddouz, 90+5', Morocco vs Iran, 2018
 Only own goal during extra time
 Jimmy Dickinson, 94', England vs Belgium, 1954
 Only own goal to open scoring in a tournament
 Marcelo, Brazil vs Croatia, 2014
 Only own goal in a final match
 Mario Mandžukić, Croatia vs France, 2018
 Only match with two own goals
 United States vs Portugal, 2002. Jorge Costa of Portugal scored for the United States, and Jeff Agoos of the United States scored for Portugal.
Tournament
 Most own goals, tournament
 12 (2018)
 Tournaments with no own goals
 1934, 1950, 1958, 1962, 1990
 Most own goals by a team in one tournament
 Most own goals in favour of a team in one tournament
 2,  (2014, 2018)
Teams
 Most own goals by a team, overall
 4, 
 Most own goals in favour of a team, overall
 6, 
 Most matches, never scoring an own goal
 73, 
 Most matches, never benefiting from an own goal
 60, 
 Most matches, never scoring or benefiting from an own goal
 26, 
 Only team to have scored multiple own goals for the same opponent
  /  scored two own goals for  /  (1954, 1998)
 Only pair of teams to have scored own goals for each other
Players
 Youngest player with an own goal
Manuel Rosas, age 18, Mexico vs Chile, 1930
 Oldest player with an own goal
Sergei Ignashevich, age 38, Russia vs Spain, 2018
 Players who have scored own goals and regular goals
 Manuel Rosas of Mexico scored twice against Argentina in 1930
 Ruud Krol of the Netherlands scored against Argentina in 1974
 Ernie Brandts of the Netherlands scored against Austria and Italy in 1978
 Siniša Mihajlović of Yugoslavia scored against Iran in 1998
 Park Chu-young of South Korea scored against Nigeria in 2010
 Carles Puyol of Spain scored against Germany in 2010
 Fernandinho of Brazil scored against Cameroon in 2014
 Denis Cheryshev of Russia scored twice against Saudi Arabia and once against Egypt and Croatia in 2018
 Mario Mandžukić of Croatia scored twice against Cameroon in 2014, and once against Denmark, England and France in 2018
 Enzo Fernández of Argentina scored against Mexico in 2022
 Players to score for both teams in a match
Ernie Brandts, Netherlands vs Italy, 1978
Mario Mandžukić, Croatia vs France, 2018
Various
 The own goal that Honduran goalkeeper Noel Valladares scored for France in 2014 was the first World Cup goal (of any kind) to be awarded with goal-line technology.
  has scored more own goals (one) than regular goals (zero).
  and  have benefited from as many own goals (one) as regular goals (one).
 It is believed that the murder of Colombian footballer Andrés Escobar in the immediate aftermath of the 1994 World Cup was a retaliation for his having scored an own goal which contributed to his team's elimination from the tournament.

By team

See also

 List of FIFA World Cup records and statistics
 List of FIFA Women's World Cup own goals
 List of UEFA European Championship own goals

Notes

References

Reports

External links
 9 own goals at the WC (YouTube) 

Own goals
Own goals
World Cup own goals